Mohammad Bahrami (1898–1957) was an Iranian communist politician. Bahrami belonged to the group of "fifty-three" and was a senior member of the Tudeh Party of Iran. He was a member of the executive committee of the party and served as the acting first-secretary during exile of Reza Radmanesh, when the party went underground. He was imprisoned in 1955 and released in 1957. Shortly after, he died from diabetes, which he suffered since the 1930s.

References

First Secretaries of Tudeh Party of Iran
1898 births
1957 deaths
Humboldt University of Berlin alumni
Iranian expatriates in East Germany
Deaths from diabetes
Co-General-Secretaries of the Tudeh Party of Iran
Communist Party of Persia politicians